The Bolshoy Kub is a river in Perm Krai, Russia, a left tributary of the Veslyana, which in turn is a tributary of the Kama. The Bolshoy Kub flows into the Veslyana  from the larger river's mouth.

References 

Rivers of Perm Krai